Princess Bokon (Hangul: 복온공주, Hanja: 福溫公主; 26 October 1818 - 12 May 1832) was a Korean princess, as the second daughter of Sunjo of Joseon and Queen Sunwon of the Andong Kim clan.

Biography
She was born on October 26, 1818 as the second daughter of Sunjo of Joseon and Queen Sunwon of the Andong Kim clan. On November 10, 1824, at the of 7 years old, she was granted the title of Princess Bokon (복온공주, 福溫公主).

On April 20, 1830, when she was 12 years old, there was a selection for her husband and the winner was Kim Byeong-ju (김병주), son of Kim Yeon-geun (김연근), from the Andong Kim clan. They were formally married on May 20, 1830, and he was granted the title of Prince Consort Changnyeong (창녕위).

Princess Bokon died just 2 years after the wedding, on May 12, 1832. She was buried alongside her husband, who died on March 28, 1853. The tomb is known as Gongjureung (공주릉) or "The Princess's tomb".

The properties in Beon-dong, Seoul, which belonged to the Princess and her husband, were designated as cultural property No. 40 of the Seoul Metropolitan Government on September 13, 2002.

Family
Father: Sunjo of Joseon (29 July 1790 - 13 December 1834) (조선 순조왕)
Grandfather: Jeongjo of Joseon (28 October 1752 - 18 August 1800) (조선 정조왕)
Grandmother: Royal Noble Consort Su of the Bannam Park clan (8 May 1770 - 26 December 1822) (수빈 박씨)
Mother: Queen Sunwon of the Andong Kim clan (8 June 1789 - 21 September 1857) (순원왕후 김씨)
Grandfather : Kim Jo-sun (1765 - 1832) (김조순)
Grandmother : Internal Princess Consort Cheongyang of the Cheongsong Shim clan (1766 - 1828) (청양부부인 청송 심씨)
Sibling(s):
Older brother: Yi Yeong, Crown Prince Hyomyeong (18 September 1809 - 25 June 1830) (이영 효명세자)
Sister-in-law: Crown Princess Jo of the Pungyang Jo clan (21 January 1809 - 4 June 1890) (세자빈 조씨)
Nephew: Heonjong of Joseon (8 September 1827 - 25 July 1849) (조선 헌종왕)
1st Niece-in-law: Queen Hyohyeon of the Andong Kim clan (27 April 1828 - 18 October 1843) (효현왕후 김씨)
2nd Niece-in-law: Queen Hyojeong of the Namyang Hong clan (6 March 1831 - 2 January 1904) (효정왕후 홍씨)
Older sister: Princess Myeongon (13 October 1810 - 13 June 1832) (명온공주)
Brother-in-law: Kim Hyeong-geun, Prince Consort Dongnyeong (1810 - 1868) (김현근 동녕위)
Adopted nephew: Kim Byeon-chan (김병찬)
Younger sister: Princess Deokon (10 June 1822 - 24 May 1844) (덕온공주)
Brother-in-law: Yun Ui-seong, Prince Consort Namnyeong (? - 1887) (윤의선 남녕위)
Adopted nephew: Yun Yong-gu (윤용구)
Consort: 
Husband: Kim Byeon-ju, Prince Consort Changnyeong (1819 - 1853) (김병주 창녕위)
Father-in-law: Kim Yeon-geun (김연근)

References

1818 births
1832 deaths
Princesses of Joseon
19th-century Korean people
19th-century Korean women
Royalty and nobility who died as children